Dalibor Davidović (born 3 January 1972 in Našice) is a musicologist and university professor. 

Davidović studied musicology at the Zagreb Music Academy (B.A. and M.A.) and obtained his PhD from the University of Hamburg.

His principal areas of research are systematic musicology and aesthetics of music. He published extensively on the epistemological problems of the music studies. In his book Identity and Music: Between Criticism and Technique he explores the contemporary music scholarship concerned with identity politics. His recent research has been focused on the notion of anarchy in the work of John Cage, on the music ontology of Jewish philosopher Ivan Focht, and on the work of German artist Hans-Jürgen Syberberg.

He teaches at the Department of Musicology at the Music Academy in Zagreb. From 2016 to 2018 visiting researcher at Berlin University of the Arts. He translated into Croatian books on aesthetics and on philosophy of religion.

Books 
Istraživanja recepcije u muzikologiji i njihovi izgledi (Reception Research in Musicology and its Prospects), Zagreb: Croatian Musicological Society, 2002, 
Identität und Musik: Zwischen Kritik und Technik (Identity and Music: Between Criticism and Technique), Vienna: Mille Tre, 2006, 
Nach dem Ende der Welt (After the End of the World), Rostock: Altstadt-Druck, 2020,

Articles 
Foucault hört hin, in: Andreas Holzer & Annegret Huber (eds.): Musikanalysieren im Zeichen Foucaults (= Anklaenge: Wiener Jahrbuch für Musikwissenschaft), Wien: Mille Tre, 2014, pp. 55-68,  
 Branches, Musicological Annual 51 (2015) 2, 9-25. ISSN 0580-373X (On the notion of anarchy in the work of John Cage)

Translations 
Alexander García Düttmann: Visconti: Uvidi u krvi i mesu (Visconti: Insights into Flesh and Blood), Zagreb: Blok, 2006, 
Christoph Menke: Prisutnost tragedije: Ogled o sudu i igri (The Presence of Tragedy: An Essay on Judgement and Play), Beograd – Zagreb: Beogradski krug – Multimedijalni institut, 2008, 
Jacob Taubes: Zapadna eshatologija (Occidental Eschatology), Zagreb: Antibarbarus, 2009,

References 

1972 births
Living people
People from Našice
Croatian musicologists
Academy of Music, University of Zagreb alumni
University of Hamburg alumni